Wetbacks is a 1956 American crime film directed by Hank McCune and starring Lloyd Bridges, Nancy Gates and Barton MacLane. An independent production, the title is a reference to "wetbacks" a now derogatory term for immigrants coming into the United States across the Mexican border. Location shooting too place around Santa Catalina Island and San Pedro in Los Angeles. It has plot similarities to the 1950 film The Breaking Point.

Synopsis
The United States Coast Guard is concerned by the about human trafficking going on with large numbers of illegal immigrants being tricked into entering the country by promises of good jobs, only then to be economically exploited as cheap labor. Meanwhile, ex-Coast Guard officer Jim Benson, running a struggling charter fishing boat business, is reluctantly persuaded to carry a consignment of migrants from Mexico to California.

Cast
 Lloyd Bridges as Jim Benson
 Nancy Gates as Sally Parker
 Barton MacLane as 	Karl Shanks
 John Hoyt as 	Steve Bodine
 Harold Peary as 	Juan Ortega
 Nacho Galindo as 	Alfonso
 Robert Keys as 	Reeser
 David Colmans as 	Pedro	
 Louis Jean Heydt as 	Coast Guard Comdr. Randall
 Roy Gordon as Hoppy
 I. Stanford Jolley as 	Fred
 Wally Cassell as 	Coast Guard lieutenant
 Tom Keene as 	Highway Patrol Inspector
 Salvador Baguez as Mexican Policeman
 Jose Gonzales-Gonzales as Immigrant
 Gene Roth as Truck Thug

References

Bibliography
 Craig, Rob. Ed Wood, Mad Genius: A Critical Study of the Films. McFarland, 2009.
 Spicer, Andrew. Historical Dictionary of Film Noir. Scarecrow Press, 2010.

External links
 

1956 films
1956 crime films
American crime films
Films set in Mexico
1950s English-language films
1950s American films